Banco is the debut studio album by American rapper Sir Michael Rocks. The album was released on July 29, 2014, by 6 Cell Phones. The album features guest appearances from Twista, Casey Veggies, Iamsu!, Robb Banks, Pouya, Mac Miller, Trinidad James, Too Short, Buddy and Chuck Inglish.

Background
In a July 2014, interview with Nah Right he spoke about how he chose the features for the album, saying: "Well, the way I go about picking features, I always try to pick people that are going to add something to the song who would serve a necessary purpose on this song. I don’t ever take a feature because so-and-so is hot or I need to get with ‘em. It doesn’t even work like that. Niggas don’t even give me features like that. I’m definitely not about to do that. I just pick people who serve a purpose on a song and make the song better, and some people are friends of mine and people I admire and respect, so I just pick people who make the song better and serve a purpose on it."

Release and promotion
On December 17, 2013, the album's first single "Memo" was released. On January 14, 2014, the music video was released for "Memo". On June 19, 2014, the music video was released for "Playstation 1.5". On July 15, 2014, the music video was released for "Fuck SeaWorld". On July 23, 2014, the music video was released for "Bussin'" featuring Casey Veggies and Iamsu!.

Critical response

Banco was met with generally positive reviews from music critics. Jesse Fairfax of HipHopDX stated "The choice of shrouding his trademark oddity in stock cuts and sheer confidence is a curious one, but Banco remains entertaining for the most part." Erin Lowers of Exclaim! said, "While the definitive setting of Banco is Chi-Town's disruptive powers and anger, Mikey Rocks brings forth the warming soul that soothes it. Having already established a career within the boom-bap realm, Sir Michael Rock's reinvention as a solo artist rips apart the blueprints he once laid and sets a foundation that may lead straight to el Banco." Michael Blair of XXL stated, "There are undeniable moments of prosperity within Banco, and it’s impossible to not vibe with Sir Michael for owning his lyrical distinction as confident as he does his luxurious wardrobe. But upon completion of the album, Banco unquestionably leaves the listener yearning for a certain type of production that more appropriately suits his lyrical capacity." Adam Kivel of Consequence of Sound said, "Though elements of it seem somewhat unconnected, Banco should go a long way towards making the solo stuff just as much of a hot commodity."

Track listing

Charts

References

2014 debut albums
Albums produced by DJ Mustard
Albums produced by Mac Miller